FINA Junior Water Polo World Championships is an international water polo tournament held every two years for the players under the age of 20. It was launched by FINA in 1981 for men and in 1995 for women . 
 
The 2009 championships were played with U18 teams each, but in 2011 the FINA switched to U20 teams again.

Editions

Men

Women

Medals

Men

Women

See also
 FINA World Junior Swimming Championships
 FINA World Junior Diving Championships
 FINA World Junior Synchronised Swimming Championships
 FINA World Junior Open Water Swimming Championships

References

External links
Fina archives
https://www.the-sports.org/water-polo-2021-men-s-world-junior-championships-epr113991.html
https://www.the-sports.org/water-polo-2021-women-s-world-junior-championships-epr113211.html
https://www.the-sports.org/water-polo-2020-men-s-world-championships-u16-epr105260.html
https://www.the-sports.org/water-polo-2020-women-s-world-championships-u16-epr105266.html
https://www.the-sports.org/water-polo-2018-men-s-world-youth-championships-epr86181.html
https://www.the-sports.org/water-polo-2018-women-s-world-youth-championships-epr86187.html

Junior
Under-20 sports competitions
Waterpolo